Mașloc is a commune in Timiș County, Romania. It is composed of three villages: Alioș, Mașloc (commune seat) and Remetea Mică. It also included Fibiș until 2004, when it was split off to form a separate commune.

Name 
The German name of the village, Blumenthal, means "village of flowers". The German colony was built in a wildflower meadow, hence the name. This is also illustrated by the old stamp of the village, depicting a valley and a flower vase with a lush bouquet of flowers. The Romanian population had great difficulties pronouncing the German name. Therefore they named the village Maslog, as shown in a map from 1864–1865. Maslog was written with "s" and not with the Romanian "ș" (s-comma). Maslog was changed to Mașloc, apparently taking over the ending "-loc" from the Hungarian "-lak" (Máslak). The Hungarian lak – just like the Romanian loc – means "place".

History 
Mașloc was first mentioned as Machalaka in 1326. Most of its inhabitants fled after the Turkish conquest of Banat (1552). From this time on, the houses were only temporarily inhabited by people of different nationalities. After the Austrians conquered Banat from the Turks, the village was called Maschlok and had 14 houses.

Mașloc was colonized by Germans from Schwarzwald between 1770–1771, who named it Blumenthal. By 1773, the colony had 93 houses, a school and a pub.

Demographics 

Mașloc had a population of 2,285 inhabitants at the 2011 census, down 1% from the 2002 census. Most inhabitants are Romanians (77.68%), larger minorities being represented by Ukrainians (10.9%), Roma (2.8%) and Hungarians (1.58%). For 6.08% of the population, ethnicity is unknown. By religion, most inhabitants are Orthodox (86%), but there are also minorities of Pentecostals (2.67%), Old Believers (2.23%) and Roman Catholics (1.75%). For 6.13% of the population, religious affiliation is unknown.

References 

Communes in Timiș County
Localities in Romanian Banat
Former Danube Swabian communities in Romania